The 1942 Montana Grizzlies football team represented the University of Montana in the 1942 college football season as a member of the Pacific Coast Conference (PCC).

Clyde Carpenter led the Grizzlies in his only season as head coach; they played their three home games on campus in Missoula at Dornblaser Field and lost all eight games  shut out in the final five, all in conference.

With manpower shortages due to World War II, Montana's football program went on hiatus after this season and resumed play in 1945.

Schedule

References

External links
Game program: Montana at WSC – October 10, 1942

Montana
Montana Grizzlies football seasons
College football winless seasons
Montana Grizzlies football